Chak no 38 is a village in Mandi Bahauddin District, Pakistan, located  south of Mandi Bahauddin.

Its zip code is 50471. It was well known during British rule due to its organized bazaars and local markets which were under the control of the Chowdhury community. The village is named after the Choudhury tribes who traditionally came here with their families according to the normal practice for a Chak (village) of Pakistani Punjab. They lived beside a bend in the canal  which flows through an Upper Jehlum canal, which was a suitable, sheltered location. This is the reason why it is called Dinga Chak.

Demographics 
The population of Chak No 38 is over 6170 people including Daira's. The literacy rate is over 50%. There is the Government Primary School for Boys which is one of the oldest in the area and was established in 1992 and Elementary School for Girls which was established in 1993. There is also a Basic Health Unit in the village. Culturally, Dinga Chak is a very diverse village, with people from different clans residing.

Economy 
Before 1993, agriculture was the only source of income for the people of the village but now many young men are working in Europe and the Middle East and send remittances home to their families. Many educated people are serving the nation and the area by working in government and private jobs after completing their higher education.

References

Villages in Pakistan
Mandi Bahauddin District
Bazaars
Villages in Punjab, Pakistan
Populated places in Mandi Bahauddin District
Villages in Mandi Bahauddin District